Hitwise is a division of Connexity, that measures behavior across desktop, tablet and smartphone devices. 

The service provides data on trends in visitor and search behavior, visitor and website profiling and measures website market share.

In 2006 Hitwise was valued at £180m and was subsequently acquired by Experian for $240m on 19 April 2007.

In 2015 Hitwise was acquired by Digital marketing company, Connexity, in a combined worth $47 Million on 14 December 2015.

History 

Hitwise was founded in 1997 in Melbourne by Adrian Giles and Andrew Barlow. Adrian Giles acted as Managing Director from 1997 to 2000. Andrew Barlow acted as Chairman and Joint-Managing Director from 1997 to 2000.
It launched the "competitive intelligence" service in 2000; a service that allows subscription access to Hitwise's reports.

In 2001  Hitwise launched in New Zealand, Hong Kong, United Kingdom and Singapore.
In 2003  Hitwise launched in the United States.
In 2006  Hitwise purchased HitDynamics, a bid management and web analytics platform.
In 2009 Hitwise launched in Canada and Brazil.
In 2010 Hitwise launched in France and India.

Acquisitions
Hitwise was acquired by Experian in 2007.
Hitwise was acquired by Connexity in 2015.
Hitwise closed in 2020.

Awards 
 2003: Australian Entrepreneur of the Year Awards Finalist – Adrian Giles (founder)
 2004: UK Revolution Awards – Winner Most Innovative UK Digital Business
 2002–2006: Deloitte Fast 50

See also 
Competitors in the internet market research space include Nielsen, Alexa, comScore, Netcraft, Quantcast, SimilarWeb and Spyfu.

References  

Market research companies of Australia
Market research companies of the United States
1997 establishments in Australia
Companies established in 1997